Kirsten Stumpf is a retired West German slalom canoeist who competed in the late 1960s. She won a bronze medal in the K-1 team event at the 1967 ICF Canoe Slalom World Championships in Lipno.

References

External links 
 Kirsten STUMPF at CanoeSlalom.net

West German female canoeists
Possibly living people
Year of birth missing (living people)
Medalists at the ICF Canoe Slalom World Championships